Nguyễn Hữu Thắng (born December 1971  in Ha Tinh, Vietnam) is a Vietnamese professional football manager and former player.

He was a member and captain of the Vietnam in his playing days. He went to Sông Lam Nghệ An as manager in 2005.

Early life 
Hữu Thắng was born December 1971 in Đức Thọ, Hà Tĩnh. His family moved from Đức Thọ to live in Vinh. His parent worked at Nghệ An Print Company (his mother died).

Club career

Sông Lam Nghệ An 
Hữu Thắng played for Sông Lam Nghệ An as a player. He retired from being a footballer in 2005.

International career 
He played for the Vietnam national football team at the 1996 Tiger Cup, the 1998 Tiger Cup and the 2000 Tiger Cup, as well as the football tournament of the 1995 and 1997 SEA Games.

He also played for the Vietnam national futsal team between 1997-1998.

Manager 
Hữu Thắng served as manager for several clubs before being appointed as manager of Sông Lam Nghệ An in 2010. Sông Lam Nghệ won the National Cup in 2010 and the V-League and the Super Cup in 2011 under his guidance.

In February 2016, it was announced that Hữu Thắng will be the new manager of the Vietnam national team. On the 4 March 2016 he signed a new contract for two-years.

On 24 August 2017, after being unable to bring Vietnamese team over group stage of SEA games 2017, he resigned his post.

He is currently appointed as the Chairman of Ho Chi Minh Football Club.

Honors

Club 
 Sông Lam Nghệ An
Super Cup:2011 (manager)
National Cup:2010 (manager)
V-League: 2000 (footballer), 2011 (manager)

References

External links 
 

1972 births
Living people
Vietnamese footballers
Vietnamese football managers
Song Lam Nghe An FC players
V.League 1 players
People from Nghệ An province
Vietnam international footballers
Vietnam national football team managers
Southeast Asian Games silver medalists for Vietnam
Southeast Asian Games medalists in football
Association football defenders
Competitors at the 1995 Southeast Asian Games
Competitors at the 1997 Southeast Asian Games
Footballers at the 1998 Asian Games
Asian Games competitors for Vietnam